The Taichung Shiyakusho is a historical building in West District, Taichung, Taiwan.

History
The building was constructed in 1911 as a municipal building under the Japanese rule of Taiwan. The building underwent renovation in 2014 and was reopened in February 2016 as a café and art center.

Architecture
The building is a three-story Baroque-style structure. The ground floor houses the Café 1911 which is operated by Rose House Group. The two upper floors house an art center.

Transportation
The building is accessible within walking distance west of Taichung Station of Taiwan Railways.

See also
 List of tourist attractions in Taiwan

References

1911 establishments in Taiwan
2016 establishments in Taiwan
Art centers in Taichung
Baroque architecture in Taiwan
Government buildings completed in 1911
Restaurants in Taiwan